Beer has a long history in what is now the Czech Republic, with brewing taking place in Břevnov Monastery in 993. The city of Brno had the right to brew beer from the 12th century while Plzeň and České Budějovice (Pilsen and Budweis in German), had breweries in the 13th century.

The most common Czech beers are pale lagers of pilsner type, with characteristic transparent golden colour, high foaminess and lighter flavour. The Czech Republic has the highest beer consumption per capita in the world.

The largest Czech beer breweries are Pilsner Urquell (Plzeňský prazdroj, the world's first pilsner, Gambrinus, Velkopopovický Kozel, Radegast and Master brands), Staropramen (Staropramen, Ostravar, Braník and Velvet) and Budweiser Budvar. Other top selling brands include Krušovice, Starobrno, Březňák, Zlatopramen, Lobkowicz, Bernard and Svijany.

History

The history of beer in the modern Czech Republic, historically Bohemia, Moravia, and Silesia, goes back even before the Slavic migration in the 6th century, although the ingredients differed from those used today.

Hops have been grown, used in beer making and exported from here since the twelfth century. Most towns had at least one brewery, the most famous brewing cities in Bohemia being Budweis, Plzeň, and Prague. Other towns with breweries are Rakovník, Žatec, and Třeboň.

Beer in České Budějovice

Today the city has two main breweries: Budějovický měšťanský pivovar a.s. (Samson Budweiser Bier) and Budějovický Budvar n.p. (Budweiser Budvar).

The city of České Budějovice was for centuries also known by its German name, Budweis. Brewing is recorded in the city since the 13th century. The modern Budějovický měšťanský pivovar was founded in 1795 as the Bürgerliches Brauhaus Budweis, and is the oldest brewery in the world to use the term "budweiser" when referring to its beer. In 1895, the Budějovický Budvar brewery opened as an ethnically Czech alternative to the German dominated Budějovický měšťanský pivovar.

In 1876, the US brewer Anheuser-Busch began making a beer which it also called "Budweiser". This led to the "Budweiser trademark dispute" between beer companies claiming trademarks rights to the name. In the European Union, Budějovický Budvar is recognized as a product with Protected Geographical Indication. Because of such disputes, Budvar is sold in the United States and Canada under the label Czechvar and Anheuser-Busch sells its beer as Bud in the most of the European Union.

Beer in Plzeň 

Pilsner Urquell was the first "pilsner" type beer in the world. In 1842, a brewery in Plzeň employed Josef Groll, a German brewer who was experienced in the Bavarian lager method of making beer. Beer in Plzeň at the time was not of very good quality and they needed to compete. Groll developed a golden Pilsner beer, the first light coloured lager beer ever brewed. It became an immediate success, and was exported all over the Austrian Empire.  A special train of beer travelled from Plzeň to Vienna every morning.  Exports of Czech beer reached Paris and the United States by 1874. Today, beers made at Plzeňský Prazdroj are Pilsner Urquell, Gambrinus and Primus.

Beer in Prague
Much of the brewing history of the Czech capital is connected to the various monasteries in the city, with brewing first recorded at the Benedictine Břevnov Monastery in 993 AD. It is also recorded that in 1088 AD, King Vratislav II granted a tithe of hops to the Canons of Vyšehrad Cathedral in order to brew beer.

Today the Prague brewing scene is quite diverse, with Staropramen being the only industrial brewery. There is a total of 40 breweries and brewpubs, the oldest among them being U Fleků, which was founded in 1499 and has been brewing beer ever since. Most of the other breweries and brewpubs have been established in the city post-1989 and especially, post-2000.

Beer in Žatec
The tradition of brewing beer in Žatec spans over 700 years. Žatecký Pivovar has been owned by Carlsberg Group since 2014. Previously, it was wholly owned by Kordoni Holding Limited based out of Nicosia in Cyprus.

Beer in Brno and South Moravia
South Moravia is known for winemaking and there are only few large breweries, namely Starobrno in Brno and Černá hora, although since the 2000s Akciový Pivovar Dalešice, Pegas and Richard have been gaining country wide popularity, despite smaller production.

Categories of beer 

Most beer brewed in the Czech Republic is lager. Czech beers vary in colour from pale (Světlé), through amber (Polotmavé) and dark (Tmavé) to black (Černé) and in strength from 3–9% ABV. Top fermented wheat beer (Pšeničné pivo) is also available.

In the Czech Republic, it is still customary to label the strength of beer by the so-called degree scale (in Czech: Stupňovitost). It is expressed as a weight percentage of sucrose and is used to indicate the percentage by weight of extract (sucrose) in a solution. So, the 12° beer has 12% of these substances dissolved in water. A 10 degree beer is about 4% alcohol by volume, a 12 degree is about 5% and 16 degree is about 6.5%.

According to Czech law, categories of beer, regardless of colour or style, are:

 lehké – a "light" beer brewed below 8° Balling and with less than 130kJ per 100ml
 výčepní – a "draught" beer, though it can be bottled, brewed between 8° and 10°
 ležák – a "lager" beer, brewed between 11° and 12.99°
 speciál – a "special" beer, brewed above 13°

Originally, Pilsner was a specific term for beers brewed in Plzeň (with Pilsner Urquell being registered as a trademark by the first brewery). The term has come to mean any pale, hoppy lager as a result of imitations of the original beer, especially in Germany where the style is common.

Festivals

There are a lot of beer festivals in the Czech Republic. One of them is Pilsner Fest, a two-day beer festival held each year by the Pilsner Urquell Brewery in Pilsen with music by local bands on four stages in the town or festival Slavnosti piva v Českých Budějovicích (in České Budějovice).

The Czech Beer Festival (Český pivní festival) in Prague is the biggest beer festival in Czech Republic held for 17 days every year in May. Festival visitors can taste more than 70 brands of Czech beer.

Research institutions
 Malting Institute in Brno
 Research Institute of Brewing and Malting
 Hop Research Institute

Exports

Overview 
With over forty industrial breweries and seventy small and medium-sized family breweries in the Czech Republic, beer is one of the most important and well known exports in the Czech Republic.  In 2016, approximately 3.68 million hectoliters of beer was exported within the European Union.  As of 2017, the Czech Republic was number ten in the world's top beer exports, with an export amount of 273.9 million dollars in exports and 1.9 percent of the world's total beer exports. Within the European Union, the Czech Republic was ranked as the seventh largest producer.

Forty percent of beer in the Czech Republic is exported to Germany, Slovakia, Sweden, England, and Russia. Additionally, Czech exports to China doubled from 2014 to 2015, and 0.65 of 3.65 million hectoliters of beer was exported to China.  In 2015, Slovakia imported 1,108 thousand hectoliters of beer and Germany imported 900 thousand hectoliters. There has been a steady decrease in beer consumption within the Czech Republic, but breweries have noted an increase in their production due to rising international interest in Czech beer.

Exports are especially important for Czech breweries, as consumption in the Czech Republic has decreased by about five liters per person. CEO of Staropramen, Petr Kovařík, speculates this is due to a smoking ban in the Czech Republic.

Economic Impacts of Beer 
The total employment generated by the beer sector in the Czech Republic provided about 76,000 jobs in 2014. This number actually declined by 4.6 percent from 2013, and this shift may be explained by the increasing number of microbreweries and specialty beers, or more beer mixes and ciders being consumed.  In 2013 and 2014, the total consumer spending on beer within the Czech Republic, in euros, was at 2,563,000 million euros and 2,431,000 euros respectively.  Additionally, the total brewing production increased in 2013 to 2014 from 18.7 billion euros to 19.1 billion euros.  This production included all brewing companies, breweries, and microbreweries.  In total, in 2016 the Czech breweries produced a record amount of beer, at 20.48 million hectoliters.  This was an increase from 2015 of 1.5 percent.  Tourists consumed 750,000 hectoliters of beer in 2016, and this was an increase from 2015 of nineteen percent.  In 2012, beer production accounted for 0.8 percent of nominal gross domestic product, and the Czech government benefits from taxes paid on beer.  Revenue from excise duties, VAT tax, and income tax in 2012 was about 28,506 million Czech korunas.

Brewing Companies

Plzeňský Prazdroj Group 
For more general information on Pilsner beer, see the article: Pilsner Urquell Brewery.

Founded in 1842, the most popular brewing company in the Czech Republic has grown significantly since its creation.  In present day, the Plzeňský Prazdroj group of breweries brews the following beers: Pilsner Urquell, Gambrinus, Velkopopovický Kozel, and Radegast.  This group has three separate breweries, each of which produce their own specific beer. As the most popular brewing group in the Czech Republic, their exports of beer continue to grow annually and their popularity continues to spread across the world.  Not only is the beer popular internationally, but in the Czech Republic, on average forty percent of the beers served in the Czech Republic are brewed from Plzeňský Prazdroj.

In 2010, the Plzeňský Prazdroj group saw an increase in exports by five percent, especially in the German market, with 240,000 hectoliters, the Slovak market, with 114,500 hectolitres, and the British market, with 24,000 hectolitres.  Additionally, in 2010 they began to sell their beers to the United Arab Emirates, Syria, South Korea, Vietnam, and Argentina.

In 2012, the Plzeňský Prazdroj group announced they had the largest beer exports yet, with a record of 685 thousand hectoliters. There continued to be an increase in sales in Slovakia, with additional export sales to Canada and Hungary.  The group estimated an increase in exports to Australia by forty percent.

The company credits their growing sales to Asian countries like Vietnam and Taiwan to the number of international visitors to their country; Taiwan is the third largest nationality that visits the brewery every year, after Czechs and Germans.

In an effort to boost their popularity and continue to grow their worldwide reputation, in 2018 the Plzeňský Prazdroj group invested over 280 million Czech koruna into expanding production facilities.  The goal of the expansion project is to keep up with increasing their export demands.  Currently, the brewery produces 62,800 hectoliters of beer a week, but the goal is to increase production to 88,300 hectolitres a week.  After the expansion, 3.5 million hectolitres of Pilsner Urquell will be produced annually.

Sales in South Korea increased forty percent in 2017 from the previous year, with half the sales being Velkopopovický Kozel. A half-liter can of Pilsner Urquell sells for 500 Czech Koruna, which is ten times the price it is sold for in the Czech Republic.

In 2016, Plzeňský Prazdroj sold 11 million hectolitres of beer, with an increase in 1 million hectoliters, and exports grew by ten percent.

Additionally, it is speculated that the increase in beer exports and consumption is contributed to the fact that the brewing company's parent company, SABMiller, was sold to the Japanese company Asahi Breweries.  The company sought out to acquire more brewing companies, as beer consumption has been declining in Japan.

In present day, in 2017, over one third of Plzeňský Prazdroj's sales were from exports, which is an increase of eight percent from the previous year.  Exports increased by 1.5 million hectoliters.  In April, right after Ashai Breweries purchased Plzeňský Prazdroj, the company began exporting to China and the beer is now available in large cities in China. Karel Kraus, the manager of the Pilsner Urquell brand, credits the success of the brewing company to their increase in beer on tap, which is exported to more than thirty countries and represents twenty percent of the Pilsner Urquell beer industry.

Staropramen Brewery 
For more general information on Staropramen Brewery, see Staropramen Brewery.

Available in more than thirty five countries worldwide, Pivovary Staropramen is the second largest beer producer in the Czech Republic.  The beers brewed by this company are: Staropramen, Braník, and Velvet.  Currently, the company operates two breweries: Staropramen and Ostravar.  It has been in business since 1998 and it holds 15.6 percent of the domestic market. Staropramen is owned by Molson Coors, and one of the primary goals of the parent company is to strengthen its sales in the United Kingdom.

In 2008, Staropramen exported 687,000 hectoliters of beer.  This can be compared to present day, where in 2017, Staropramen sold 3.1 million hectoliters of beer. This was an increase of six thousand hectoliters from the previous year.

According to the CEO of Staropramen, Petr Kovařík, the goal of the company is: “...not to be in as many countries as possible, but we only choose the strategic markets. Where we enter, we try to do a good job.” The largest export country for Staropramen is Slovakia, and then Sweden, Germany and Great Britain.  Additionally, sales in Poland have grown by ten percent in the last two years. Sales in central and southeast Europe have grown by thirty percent in the last year.

In 2016, Staropramen has launched its lighter beer Pravha in the UK, which is now brewed in Burton upon Trent. This has become quite controversial with many consumers. Although brewed to the Czech recipe, the taste has been compromised.

Heineken Ceska Republika Group 
Heineken is the third largest beer producer in the world, and the Heineken Ceska Republika Group owns three breweries in the Czech Republic. The company produces and exports Starobrno, Krušovice, Zlatopramen, and Březňák.

Budejovicky Budvar 
Budejovicky Budvar, not to be confused with the American company Budweiser, is the one of the largest brewing companies in the Czech Republic and produces Budweiser, Budvar, Budweiser Budvar.  In 2014, the company exported a record number of beers, at 813,000 hectoliters.  Between 2010 and 2014, the company increase the volume of exports by thirty four percent.  The main sales are to Germany and Slovakia, where sales rose from 2013 to 2014 by ten percent and eight percent, respectively.  Russia used to be a large importer of Budejovicky Budvar beer, but after the devaluation of the rouble in 2010.

In 2017, Budejovicky Budvar continued to increase its exports and they exported a record volume of beer at 990,508 hectoliters of beer to 76 countries.  Additionally, the amount of beer exported increased in 56 countries, with the largest amount being exported to Bulgaria, China, Croatia, Canada, Germany, Austria, and Russia.  This year, Budejovicky Budvar was able to begin exporting to Africa, South America, and Asia.

After 2017, Budejovicky Budvar exported 21.5 percent of Czech beer exports.  As a result of the increase in exports, the brewery is beginning construction to expand its brewery and meet the export demand for its customers. Due to this record breaking year, Budejovicky Budvar is the second largest beer exporter in the Czech Republic.  However, the company was unable to meet all orders due to their limited production capacities.

See also

 Beer and breweries by region
Beer in Germany
Dačický
Modrá Hvězda Dobřany
Pilsner Urquell Brewery

References

External links

 A Brief History of Czech Beer Or, Everything Old is New Again
The beginner's guide to beer in Prague